The 1957–58 season was the 43rd in the history of the Isthmian League, an English football competition.

Tooting & Mitcham United were champions, winning their first Isthmian League title.

League table

References

Isthmian League seasons
I